Kinesin family member 9 (KIF9), also known as kinesin-9, is a human protein encoded by the KIF9 gene. It is part of the kinesin family of motor proteins.

Function 
The beating of the flagella in sperm is regulated by KIF9 activity.

References 

Human proteins
Motor proteins